Thunderhead, Son of Flicka is a 1945 American Western film directed by Louis King and starring Roddy McDowall, Preston Foster, and Rita Johnson. It is a sequel to the 1943 film My Friend Flicka. The film was adapted to screen by Dwight Cummins and Dorothy Yost from Mary O'Hara's novel, Thunderhead (1943), second in a trilogy with My Friend Flicka (1941) and Green Grass of Wyoming (1946).

Plot
Ken McLaughlin's (Roddy McDowall) mustang mare Flicka gives birth to an all-white colt that, unknown to Ken's dad, Rob (Preston Foster), was actually sired by a neighboring rancher's thoroughbred racehorse, Appalachia, rather than Rob's own stallion, Banner. The colt, nicknamed "Goblin", proves to be difficult, but Ken trains him to race. Ken's mother, Nell (Rita Johnson), officially names the colt Thunderhead after the billowing white clouds she sees overhead. Thunderhead is entered into his first race with Ken as the jockey, but he suffers an injury, ending his racing career.

Meanwhile, the Albino, a wild mustang stallion that has been raiding local ranchers' herds for years, steals Rob's best mares and kills Banner, putting the family near bankruptcy. The Albino is also Thunderhead's grand-sire. Rob, Ken, and the ranch hands search for the mares, but during the night, Thunderhead gets loose and runs off.

Tracking Thunderhead on foot to a secluded valley, Ken discovers the Albino's herd, including his father's horses. The Albino attacks Ken, but Thunderhead fights and kills the Albino, saving Ken's life.

Rob and the others arrive as Thunderhead rounds up the Albino's herd, heading them to the McLaughlin ranch. But once there, Thunderhead is uneasy. Rob tells Ken that Thunderhead is a king now and wants to roam his realm. Ken removes Thunderhead's halter, freeing him.

Cast
 Roddy McDowall as Ken McLaughlin 
 Preston Foster as Rob McLaughlin 
 Rita Johnson as Nelle McLaughlin 
 James Bell as Gus 
 Patti Hale as Hildy (as Diana Hale)
 Carleton Young as Maj. Harris 
 Ralph Sanford as Charlie Sargent

Filming and production
The film was shot on location at various sites, including the following:
 Oregon: Bridal Veil Falls at Oneonta Gorge and the Multnomah County Fairgrounds near Gresham, Oregon
 California: Brent's Crags, Hidden Valley, and Hollywood Park Racetrack
 Utah: Zion National Park, Kanab, Bryce Canyon National Park, Red Rock Canyon, Navajo Lake, Glendale Gorge, Cedar City, and Cedar Breaks National Monument
 Additional scenes were shot in Duck Creek, Nevada.

This was the first "Color by Technicolor" feature film to be photographed entirely on 35mm color film, in this case Technicolor (Monopack) motion picture film. Earlier Technicolor features used black and white negative film photographed behind color filters, or used Monopack only for certain sequences.

Release
The film was released on DVD and Blu-ray on February 22, 2005.

References

External links
 
 
 

1945 films
Films about horses
Films set in Wyoming
1940s English-language films
Films based on American novels
American sequel films
Films directed by Louis King
Films shot in Oregon
Films with screenplays by Dorothy Yost
Films shot in Utah
Films based on works by Mary O'Hara
Films shot in Wyoming
American Western (genre) films
1945 Western (genre) films
20th Century Fox films
1940s American films